Přestavlky is a municipality and village in Litoměřice District in the Ústí nad Labem Region of the Czech Republic. It has about 300 inhabitants.

Transport
The D8 motorway passes through the municipality.

References

Villages in Litoměřice District